The Trofeo Città di Brescia is a professional one day cycling race held annually in Italy. It was on the UCI Europe Tour as a category 1.2 race from 2005 to 2010 and again from 2017. The race was cancelled in 2020 and 2021.

Winners

References

Cycle races in Italy
UCI Europe Tour races
Recurring sporting events established in 1997
1997 establishments in Italy